The Woodcliff Lake Public Schools is a community public school district that serves students in pre-kindergarten through eighth grade from Woodcliff Lake, in Bergen County, New Jersey, United States.

As of the 2018–19 school year, the district, comprising two schools, had an enrollment of 737 students and 77.5 classroom teachers (on an FTE basis), for a student–teacher ratio of 9.5:1.

The district is classified by the New Jersey Department of Education as being in District Factor Group "J", the-highest of eight groupings. District Factor Groups organize districts statewide to allow comparison by common socioeconomic characteristics of the local districts. From lowest socioeconomic status to highest, the categories are A, B, CD, DE, FG, GH, I and J.

For ninth through twelfth grades, Woodcliff Lake public school students attend Pascack Hills High School, along with those from Montvale. The school is part of the Pascack Valley Regional High School District, which serves students from Hillsdale and River Vale at Pascack Valley High School. As of the 2018–19 school year, the high school had an enrollment of 842 students and 70.0 classroom teachers (on an FTE basis), for a student–teacher ratio of 12.0:1.

Awards and recognition
For the 2005-06 school year, Woodcliff Middle School was named a "Star School" by the New Jersey Department of Education, the highest honor that a New Jersey school can achieve.

Schools 
The schools in the district (with 2018–19 enrollment data from the National Center for Education Statistics) are:
Elementary school
Dorchester Elementary School with 464 students in grades Pre-K through 5
Stefanie Marsich, Principal
Middle school
Woodcliff Middle School which had 265 students in grades 6-8
Michael Andriulli, Principal

Administration 
Core members of the district's administration are:
Lauren Barbelet, Superintendent
Matthew L. Lynaugh, Business Administrator / Board Secretary

Board of education
The district's board of education, with nine members, sets policy and oversees the fiscal and educational operation of the district through its administration. As a Type II school district, the board's trustees are elected directly by voters to serve three-year terms of office on a staggered basis, with three seats up for election each year held (since 2012) as part of the November general election. The board appoints a superintendent to oversee the day-to-day operation of the district.

References

External links 
Woodcliff Lake Public Schools

School Data for the Woodcliff Lake Public Schools, National Center for Education Statistics
Pascack Valley Regional High School District

Woodcliff Lake, New Jersey
New Jersey District Factor Group J
School districts in Bergen County, New Jersey